The 1876 United States presidential election in Arkansas took place on November 7, 1876, as part of the 1876 United States presidential election. Voters chose six representatives, or electors to the Electoral College, who voted for president and vice president.

Arkansas voted for the Democratic candidate, Samuel J. Tilden, over Republican candidate, Rutherford B. Hayes. Tilden won Arkansas by a margin of 20.05%.

Results

See also
 United States presidential elections in Arkansas

References

Arkansas
1876
1876 Arkansas elections